A craton (or ; from   "strength") is an old and stable part of the continental lithosphere, which consists of Earth's two topmost layers, the crust and the uppermost mantle. Having often survived cycles of merging and rifting of continents, cratons are generally found in the interiors of tectonic plates; the exceptions occur where geologically recent rifting events have separated cratons and created passive margins along their edges. Cratons are characteristically composed of ancient crystalline basement rock, which may be covered by younger sedimentary rock. They have a thick crust and deep lithospheric roots that extend as much as several hundred kilometres into Earth's mantle.

Terminology 

The term craton is used to distinguish the stable portion of the continental crust from regions that are more geologically active and unstable. Cratons are composed of two layers: A continental shield, in which the basement rock crops out at the surface, and a platform which overlays the shield in some areas with sedimentary rock.

Examples 

Examples of cratons are the Dharwar Craton in India, North China Craton, the East European Craton, the Amazonian Craton in South America, the Kaapvaal Craton in South Africa, the North American Craton (also called the Laurentia Craton), and the Gawler Craton in South Australia.

Structure 
Cratons have thick lithospheric roots. Mantle tomography shows that cratons are underlain by anomalously cold mantle corresponding to lithosphere more than twice the typical  thickness of mature oceanic or non-cratonic, continental lithosphere. At that depth, craton roots extend into the asthenosphere, and the low-velocity zone seen elsewhere at these depths is weak or absent beneath stable cratons. Craton lithosphere is distinctly different from oceanic lithosphere because cratons have a neutral or positive buoyancy, and a low intrinsic density. This low density offsets density increases due to geothermal contraction and prevents the craton from sinking into the deep mantle. Cratonic lithosphere is much older than oceanic lithosphere—up to 4 billion years versus 180 million years.

Rock fragments (xenoliths) carried up from the mantle by magmas containing peridotite have been delivered to the surface as inclusions in subvolcanic pipes called kimberlites. These inclusions have densities consistent with craton composition and are composed of mantle material residual from high degrees of partial melt. Peridotite is strongly influenced by the inclusion of moisture. Craton peridotite moisture content is unusually low, which leads to much greater strength. It also contains high percentages of low-weight magnesium instead of higher-weight calcium and iron. Peridotites are important for understanding the deep composition and origin of cratons because peridotite nodules are pieces of mantle rock modified by partial melting. Harzburgite peridotites represent the crystalline residues after extraction of melts of compositions like basalt and komatiite.

Formation 

The process by which cratons were formed is called cratonization. There is much about this process that remains uncertain. However, the first cratonic landmasses likely formed during the Archean Eon. This is indicated by the age of diamonds, which originate in the roots of cratons, and which are almost always over 2 billion years and often over 3 billion years in age.  Rock of Archean age makes up only 7% of the world's current cratons; even allowing for erosion and destruction of past formations, this suggests that only 5 to 40 percent of the present continental crust formed during the Archean. Cratonization likely was completed during the Proterozoic. Subsequent growth of continents was by accretion at continental margins.

The origin of the roots of cratons is still debated. However, the present understanding of cratonization began with the publication in 1978 of a paper by Thomas H. Jordan in Nature. Jordan proposed that cratons formed from a high degree of partial melting of the upper mantle, with 30 to 40 percent of the source rock entering the melt. Such a high degree of melting was possible because of the high mantle temperatures of the Archean. The extraction of so much magma left behind a solid peridotite residue that was enriched in lightweight magnesium, and thus lower in chemical density than undepleted mantle. This lower chemical density compensated for the effects of thermal contraction as the craton and its roots cooled, so that the physical density of the cratonic roots matched that of the surrounding hotter, but more chemically dense, mantle. In addition to cooling the craton roots and lowering their chemical density, the extraction of magma also increased the viscosity and melting temperature of the craton roots and prevented mixing with the surrounding undepleted mantle. The resulting mantle roots have remained stable for billions of years. Jordan suggested that depletion occurred primarily in subduction zones and secondarily as flood basalts.

This model of melt extraction from the upper mantle has held up well with subsequent observations. The properties of mantle xenoliths confirm that the geothermal gradient is much lower beneath continents than oceans. The olivine of craton root xenoliths is extremely dry, which would give the roots a very high viscosity. Rhenium–osmium dating of xenoliths indicates that the oldest melting events took place in the early to middle Archean. Significant cratonization continued into the late Archean, accompanied by voluminous mafic magmatism. However, melt extraction alone cannot explain all the properties of craton roots. The great depths of craton roots required further explanation. The 30 to 40 percent partial melting of mantle rock at 4 to 10 GPa pressure produces komatiite magma and a solid residue very close in composition to Archean lithospheric mantle, but continental shields do not contain enough komatiite to match the expected depletion. Either much of the komatiite never reached the surface, or other processes aided craton root formation.

There are at least three hypotheses of how cratons have been formed. Jordan's suggestion was that further cratonization was a result of repeated continental collisions. The thickening of the crust associated with these collusions must have been balanced by craton root thickening according to the principle of isostacy. A second model suggests that the surface crust was thickened by a rising plume of molten material from the deep mantle. This would have built up a thick layer of depleted mantle underneath the cratons. The third model suggests that successive slabs of subducting oceanic lithosphere became lodged beneath a proto-craton, underplating the craton with chemically depleted rock.

The chemistry of xenoliths and seismic tomography both favor the two accretional models over the plume model. However, other geochemical evidence favors mantle plumes. Tomography shows two layers in the craton roots beneath North America. The second layer may be a less depleted thermal boundary layer that stagnated against the depleted "lid" formed by the first layer.

All these proposed mechanisms rely on buoyant, viscous material separating from a denser residue due to mantle flow, and it is possible that more than one mechanism contributed to craton root formation.

Erosion
The long-term erosion of cratons has been labelled the "cratonic regime". It involves processes of pediplanation and etchplanation that lead to the formation of flattish surfaces known as peneplains. While the process of etchplanation is associated to humid climate and pediplanation with arid and semi-arid climate, shifting climate over geological time leads to the formation of so-called polygenetic peneplains of mixed origin. Another result of the longevity of cratons is that they may alternate between periods of high and low relative sea levels. High relative sea level leads to increased oceanicity, while the opposite leads to increased inland conditions.

Many cratons have had subdued topographies since Precambrian times.  For example, the Yilgarn Craton of Western Australia was flattish already by Middle Proterozoic times and the Baltic Shield had been eroded into a subdued terrain already during the Late Mesoproterozoic when the rapakivi granites intruded.

See also 
 List of shields and cratons
 Cratonic sequence

References

Further reading 

  Sr. Lecturer, Geography, School of Humanities, Central Queensland University, Australia.
 

 . Symposium A08, Early Evolution of the Continental Crust.

External links 

 

 
Historical geology